Robot Wars: Advanced Destruction is the third video game based on the British game show Robot Wars. It was the third of four games based on the show, with the first three selling over 250,000 copies. It was developed by Crawfish Interactive and published by BBC Multimedia and was released exclusively for the Game Boy Advance in 2001. It was also released in the US by Vivendi Universal Games. The game is based on Series 4 of Robot Wars.

Gameplay
Like the previous game, Robot Wars: Arenas of Destruction, Advanced Destruction featured more than one arena to play in. This game featured four different arenas, War Zone - which is based on the Series 4 version of the Robot Wars Arena, Robot Factory, Steelworks, and Power Station.

In the game, a competitor robot from the series, or a robot created by the player, is entered into combat against a robot controlled by the game. A bout finishes when one robot's health bar is fully depleted or is pitted. In the Championship Mode, the player picks a robot and controls it through seven battles with the first battle being a three-way melee like Series 4.

Multiplayer is also available where up to four players can play.

There were 16 competitor robots in the game including Series champions Chaos 2, Panic Attack, Razer and Tornado.

Like in the other games, series presenter Craig Charles does not appear in the game but the commentator, Jonathan Pearce, appears. However, unlike Robot Wars: Arenas of Destruction, he does not commentate in the entire battle.

See also
 BattleBots: Beyond the BattleBox

References

2001 video games
Game Boy Advance games
Game Boy Advance-only games
Robot combat video games
Video games developed in the United Kingdom
Multiplayer and single-player video games
Crawfish Interactive games
BBC Multimedia games